Tanbaku Kar-e Pain (also Romanized as Tanbākū Kār-e Pā’īn; also known as Tanbākū Kār) is a village in Qilab Rural District, Alvar-e Garmsiri District, Andimeshk County, Khuzestan Province, Iran. At the 2006 census, its population was 15, in 4 families.

References 

Populated places in Andimeshk County